F. D. Benteen (died 1864) was an American sheet music publisher and composer during the 19th century, based out of Baltimore, Maryland.  His compositions include the Civil War song "Joys That We've Tasted."  As a publisher, he is perhaps best known for publishing many of the works of Stephen Foster. William Miller, later of Miller & Beacham, bought F.D. Benteen's publishing company in 1838.

References

American male composers
People of Maryland in the American Civil War
Musicians from Baltimore
1864 deaths
19th-century American composers
American music publishers (people)
19th-century American male musicians
19th-century American businesspeople